11-Dehydrothromboxane B2 (or 11-dehydro-TXB2) is produced from the breakdown of thromboxane A2.  It is released by activated platelets and urine levels of 11-dehydro-TXB2 can be used to monitor the response to aspirin therapy when used to prevent heart disease and in diseases where platelet activation is prominent.

References 

Eicosanoids